21 Number Ones is a compilation album by Kenny Rogers. It was released in 2006 on Capitol Records Nashville.

Track listing

Chart performance

Weekly charts

Year-end charts

Certifications

References

Kenny Rogers compilation albums
2006 compilation albums
Capitol Records compilation albums
Compilation albums of number-one songs